The baseball journal Elysian Fields Quarterly began awarding the Dave Moore Award in 1999. The honor is given to the “most important” baseball book of the year. It is named for the late Dave Moore, a well-known Minnesota broadcaster, who loved sports and literature.

Dave Moore Award Recipients 
1999 Roberto Gonzalez Echevarria for The Pride of Havana
2000 Darryl Brock for Havana Heat
2001 Tom Stanton for The Final Season
2002 Charles Korr for The End of Baseball as We Knew It
2003 Jim Bouton for Foul Ball
2004 William Kashatus for September Swoon
2005 Bob McGee for The Greatest Ballpark Ever
2006 Brad Snyder for A Well-Paid Slave 
2007 Norman L. Macht for Connie Mack and the Early Years of Baseball

See also

List of sports journalism awards

References

Awards established in 1999
Sports writing awards

Baseball trophies and awards in the United States
American literary awards
1999 establishments in Minnesota